Fritz Spindler (24 November 1817 – 26 December 1905) was a German pianist and composer, especially of works for the piano.

Biographical sketch
Born in Wurzbach, Spindler's output of more than 400 opus numbers includes salon pieces, chamber music, symphonies and other large forms, and over 300 piano pieces. But he is best remembered, if at all today, for a much-anthologized sonatina. He published almost 350 compositions.

He died in Niederlößnitz/Radebeul, near Dresden.

Publications
 Berthold Tours, Fritz Spindler: Novello, Ewer and Co.'s Pianoforte Albums. Nos. 17, 18, and 19. Compositions by Fritz Spindler, in: The Musical Times and Singing Class Circular, vol. 27, no. 524 (1 Oct. 1886), p. 611
 Otto Wagner: "Das rumanische Volkslied", in: Sammelbände der Internationalen Musikgesellschaft, vol. 4, no. 1. (November 1902), pp. 164–169.

External links

References

1817 births
1905 deaths
19th-century classical composers
19th-century classical pianists
19th-century German composers
German classical pianists
German classical composers
Male classical pianists
People from Saale-Orla-Kreis
Pupils of Friedrich Wieck
19th-century male musicians
German male classical composers